The Left was a left-wing coalition of political parties in Italy which took part in the 2019 European Parliament election. Its main members were Italian Left and the Communist Refoundation Party.

History 

The alliance is the direct heir of The Other Europe (AET), a left-wing coalition representing the anti-austerity movement which took part to the 2014 European election, obtaining 4.0% of the vote and electing three MEPs. After the election, they joined the European United Left–Nordic Green Left (GUE/NGL) Group. The list main member parties, Left Ecology Freedom (SEL) and the Communist Refoundation Party (PRC), elected one MEP each.

In the 2018 general election, the evolution of SEL, Italian Left (SI), led by Nicola Fratoianni, joined Free and Equal (LeU) while the PRC, led by Maurizio Acerbo, ran within Power to the People (PaP). However, SI and PRC broke from their respective alliances in late 2018. Fratoianni accused his LeU former allies of being too close to the Democratic Party (PD) while PRC left the PaP alliance after losing an internal vote over its statutory form.

In February 2019, Acerbo launched the proposal of a joint list composed of SI, the PRC and other minor left-wing parties to participate in the upcoming 2019 European Parliament election. The name and the symbol of were chosen through an online vote in April.

Composition
The coalition was formed by the following parties:

Electoral results

European Parliament

References

2019 disestablishments in Italy
2019 establishments in Italy
Communist Refoundation Party
Defunct left-wing political party alliances
Defunct political party alliances in Italy
Defunct socialist parties in Italy
Democratic socialist parties in Europe
Ecosocialist parties
Political parties disestablished in 2019
Political parties established in 2019
Italy